Andrew Barclay may refer to:

Andrew Barclay (bookbinder) (1737–1823), who emigrated from Scotland to the British-American colonies
Andrew Barclay (mathematician) (1849–1943), Scottish mathematician
Andrew Barclay (merchant), Scottish-American merchant
Andrew Whyte Barclay (1817–1884), Scottish physician
Andrew Barclay Sons & Co., Scottish builder of steam and diesel locomotives
Andy Barclay, character in Child's Play series

See also